Rashnudeh (also Romanized as Rashnūdeh and Rashnūdī; also known as Rashnū and Shanū) is a village in Bazvand Rural District, Central District, Rumeshkhan County, Lorestan Province, Iran. It lies east-southeast of the town of Chaqabol, next to the village of Lalvand. At the 2006 census, its population was 1,638, in 348 families.

References 

Populated places in Rumeshkhan County